Succinimide is an organic compound with the formula (CH2)2(CO)2NH. This white solid is used in a variety of organic syntheses, as well as in some industrial silver plating processes. The compound is classified as a cyclic imide. It may be prepared by thermal decomposition of ammonium succinate.

Succinimides
Succinimides refers to compounds that contain the succinimide group. These compounds have some notable uses. Several succinimides are used as anticonvulsant drugs, including ethosuximide, phensuximide, and methsuximide. 

Succinimides are also used to form covalent bonds between proteins or peptides and plastics, which is useful in a variety of assay techniques.

See also
 Succinic anhydride
 N-Hydroxysuccinimide
 N-Bromosuccinimide

References